Jannes Vansteenkiste (born 17 February 1993) is a Belgian footballer who currently plays for K.M.S.K. Deinze in the Belgian First Amateur Division.

External links

Jannes Vansteenkiste at Club Brugge

1993 births
Living people
Belgian footballers
Belgian expatriate footballers
Belgium youth international footballers
Club Brugge KV players
Roda JC Kerkrade players
Royal Antwerp F.C. players
K.M.S.K. Deinze players
Belgian Pro League players
Challenger Pro League players
Eredivisie players
Belgian Third Division players
Eerste Divisie players
Association football defenders
Belgian expatriate sportspeople in the Netherlands
Expatriate footballers in the Netherlands
People from Lendelede
Footballers from West Flanders